Venomous is a 2001 American direct-to-video disaster horror film directed by Fred Olen Ray, credited as Ed Raymond, and starring Treat Williams, Mary Page Keller and Hannes Jaenicke.

Plot
In 1991, a group of Iraqi commandos penetrate a secret American government lab, releasing genetically modified rattlesnakes. Over the following years, the snakes breed and multiply. In the present day, an earthquake drives them from the underground to the surface, and the snakes infect whoever they bite with a fatal virus. A small-town doctor tries to correct the situation, but the government wants to hide the traces of its wrongdoings. At the end of the movie, the Snake's lair is located and destroyed by an explosion, killing apparently all vipers. But the last scene shows a viper who survived.

Cast
 Treat Williams as Dr. David Henning
 Mary Page Keller as Dr. Christine Edmonton Henning
 Hannes Jaenicke as Dr. Eric Foreman
 Catherine Dent as Susan Edmonton
 Geoff Pierson as General Arthur Manchek
 Tony Denison as Major General Thomas Sparks
 Brian Poth as Billy Sanderson
 Jim Storm as Sheriff Jack Crowley
 Marc McClure as Dr. Dutton
 Andrew Stevens as Daniel Andrews
 Anthony Azizi as Male Terrorist
 Greg Collins as Grover
 Lee de Broux as Bob Jenkins

See also
List of killer snake films

External links
Venomous at the Internet Movie Database
Venomous at Rotten Tomatoes

2001 films
2001 horror films
2000s disaster films
2001 thriller drama films
2000s English-language films
American disaster films
American thriller drama films
American horror thriller films
American direct-to-video films
Direct-to-video horror films
Films about death
Films about snakes
Films directed by Fred Olen Ray
2001 drama films
2000s American films